Ženski nogometni klub Hajduk is a Croatian women's association football club based in Split and they currently compete in the Croatian Women's First Football League.
The club was founded in 2003 as ŽNK Marjan, but on 25 August 2021 signed a cooperation agreement with HNK Hajduk Split and changed its name into ŽNK Hajduk Split. The agreement is signed on one year with possibility of extension on two additional years.

Recent seasons

References

External links
ŽNK Hajduk at UEFA.com
Facebook page

Women's football clubs in Croatia
Association football clubs established in 2003
Sport in Split, Croatia
2003 establishments in Croatia
HNK Hajduk Split